The magnetosheath is the region of space between the magnetopause and the bow shock of a planet's magnetosphere. The regularly organized magnetic field generated by the planet becomes weak and irregular in the magnetosheath due to interaction with the incoming solar wind, and is incapable of fully deflecting the highly charged particles. The density of the particles in this region is considerably lower than what is found beyond the bow shock, but greater than within the magnetopause, and can be considered a transitory state.

Scientific research into the exact nature of the magnetosheath has been limited due to a longstanding misconception that it was a simple byproduct of the bow shock/magnetopause interaction and had no inherently important properties of its own.  Recent studies indicate, however, that the magnetosheath is a dynamic region of turbulent plasma flow that may play an important role in the structure of the bow shock and the magnetopause, and may help to dictate the flow of energetic particles across those boundaries. Kinetic plasma instabilities may cause further complexity by generating plasma waves and energetic particle beams in the magnetosheath and foreshock regions. 

The Earth's magnetosheath typically occupies the region of space approximately 10 Earth radii on the upwind (Sun-facing) side of the planet, extending significantly farther out on the downwind side due to the pressure of the solar wind.  The exact location and width of the magnetosheath does depend on variables such as solar activity.

See also
 Earth's magnetic field
 Interplanetary magnetic field (IMF)
 Magnetotail
 Van Allen radiation belt
 Plasmasphere
 Ionosphere
 Space weather and heliophysics

References

External links
 The Encyclopedia of Astrobiology, Astronomy, and Spaceflight
 Institute of Geophysics and Planetary Physics

Planetary science
Space plasmas
Plasma physics